"Chocolate Cake" is a song by rock music group Crowded House from their third studio album, Woodface (1991). Released as a single in May 1991, the song reached number seven in New Zealand, number nine in Canada, and number two on the US Billboard Modern Rock Tracks chart. The John Hillcoat-directed music video won the ARIA Award for Best Video at the ARIA Music Awards of 1992.

History and description
The song was not originally intended as the lead single, as it was more intended for "It's Only Natural" to be the lead track. However, despite this, "Chocolate Cake" was released as the album's lead single. Despite performing marginally better than the singles from Temple of Low Men in the United States, the song was thought to offend due to its lyrics and the song gained only moderate performance in the US, as it referred to Americans having an "excess of fat on your American bones". The song reached number two on the US Billboard Modern Rock Tracks chart while also peaking at number 20 on the Australian ARIA Singles Chart and number 69 on the UK Singles Chart.

The B-sides featured are "As Sure as I Am", a song from Woodface, and "Anyone Can Tell", which was intended for release on the album however was not released due to the amalgamation of the Woodface project with the Finn Brothers project. The song later appeared on the rarities collection Afterglow and was released as its lead promotional single.

Tracks
 "Chocolate Cake": written by Neil Finn and Tim Finn
 "As Sure as I Am", "Anyone Can Tell": written by Neil Finn
 Both "Chocolate Cake" and "As Sure as I Am" are from the album "Woodface". "Anyone Can Tell" is an outtake from the "Woodface" sessions, later to be released on the album "Afterglow"

Single release
 Released in UK as CD single and 7-inch vinyl and in US as cassette
 "Chocolate Cake" – 4:02
 "As Sure as I Am" – 2:53

EP release
 Released in UK as CD single and 12-inch vinyl and in US and Japan as CD
 "Chocolate Cake" – 4:02
 "As Sure as I Am" – 2:53
 "Anyone Can Tell" – 3:37

Charts

Weekly charts

Year-end charts

Release history

References

1991 singles
1991 songs
ARIA Award-winning songs
Capitol Records singles
Crowded House songs
Song recordings produced by Mitchell Froom
Songs written by Neil Finn
Songs written by Tim Finn